Going Back to Cali may refer to:

"Going Back to Cali" (LL Cool J song), released 1988
"Going Back to Cali" (The Notorious B.I.G. song), released 1998